Oliwia Sobieszek (born 6 April 1995) is a Polish vocalist and current lead singer for doom metal band Kroh.

Personal life and education 
Sobieszek was born in Birmingham, England. Sobieszek attended New College in Wellington, Shropshire where she studied Music Performance, Psychology, Sociology, Polish and an Extended Project Qualification. She is currently studying Psychology at the University of Birmingham and has a twin sister, Karolina Sobieszek, who studies at the same university.

Career

Red Inferno 
Sobieszek provided vocals for Red Inferno up until 2013 when she left to pursue her university degree. She performed with multiple members, including one of the original creators of Red Inferno. The band was formed in 2010 with Sobieszek as the lead vocals and was originally a punk band, until 2012 when they changed members and styles. Red Inferno played a number at gigs, their most notable performance at The Place in Oakengates in 2013.

Kroh 
Sobieszek joined Kroh as their lead vocalist in 2015 after answering an advert from Paul Kenney. Following her addition to the band, Kroh released the album Precious Bones. Kroh later released Living Water in 2015 which Sobieszek wrote the lyrics for. Sobieszek, along with Kenney, wrote the entire 9 track album and mixed the final outcome. Sobieszek recently played the O2 Academy in Sheffield stage for HRH Doom vs Stoner.

References

1995 births
Living people
English people of Polish descent
21st-century Polish women singers
21st-century Polish singers